David Spies (born 5 September 1994) is a German-American former professional footballer who played as a forward.

Career
Spies began his career playing with the U-19 and reserve teams for VfL Bochum, 1. FC Nürnberg and FC Augsburg, before he signed with United Soccer League club Charlotte Independence on 2 September 2016.

References

External links
 

1994 births
Living people
German footballers
Association football forwards
Regionalliga players
USL Championship players
1. FC Nürnberg II players
FC Augsburg II players
Charlotte Independence players
German expatriate footballers
German expatriate sportspeople in the United States
Expatriate soccer players in the United States
People from Herdecke
Sportspeople from Arnsberg (region)
Footballers from North Rhine-Westphalia